Stephen "Steve" Evans (born 7 January 1972) is a former Welsh professional darts player who played in the Professional Darts Corporation.

Career

Evans joined the PDC in 2003, and reached the last 32 of the 2004 UK Open, he beats Andy Belton, Dale Pinch & Ian Covill, eventually losing to John MaGowan.

He qualified for the 2008 PDC World Darts Championship, losing 0–3 to Steve Beaton in the first round. He also qualified for the 2011 World Championship, again losing 0–3 in the first round to Simon Whitlock.

After coming dangerously close to having to pack in the game due to the financial restraints of touring, Steve announced on 21 March 2012 that he has acquired a full sponsor to continue his PDC career. In April, he earned a place in the European Tour Event 1 in Vienna by defeating Ian Jopling and Jamie Lewis in the UK qualifier. He played Steve Brown in the first round and won 6–2, but then lost to Wes Newton 2–6 in round two. This later proved to be Evans' best result of 2012 and earned him £1,000. He also qualified for the second European Tour event, held in Berlin, with a win over John Henderson in the UK qualifier. He faced Brown again in the first round and this time lost 3–6. Evans has not competed in a PDC event since this defeat. After the 2013 PDC World Championship he was ranked world number 79, outside of the top 64 who retain their places on the PDC tour. He did not enter Q School and has therefore lost his PDC tour card for 2013. Evans was knocked out in the quarter-finals of the 2014's first Challenge Tour event 5–1 by Matthew Edgar. He did not play in an event in 2015 and only entered five in 2016.

Steve quit the PDC in January 2020.

World Championship results

PDC

 2008: First round (lost to Steve Beaton 0–3) (sets) 
 2011: First round (lost to Simon Whitlock 0–3)

References

External links
Steve Evans Official website

1972 births
Living people
Welsh darts players
Professional Darts Corporation former tour card holders
Sportspeople from Cardiff